The Choctaw, Oklahoma and Gulf Railroad (CO&G), known informally as the "Choctaw Route," was an American railroad in the states of Arkansas and Oklahoma.

Origins
The company, originally known as the Choctaw Coal and Railway Company, completed its main line between West Memphis, Arkansas and western Oklahoma by 1900.  In 1901 the CO&G chartered a subsidiary company, the Choctaw, Oklahoma and Texas Railroad, to continue construction west into the Texas panhandle, and by 1902 the railroad had extended as far west as Amarillo.

Choctaw Northern Railroad
The Watonga and Northwestern Railroad was incorporated in Oklahoma Territory on May 19, 1900.  Its name changed to the Choctaw and Northern Railroad on March 22, 1901.  Though not originally controlled by the CO&G, this railway did in the 1901-1902 timeframe build its main line from a connection with the CO&G at Geary, Oklahoma north toward the Oklahoma-Kansas border, about 106 miles distant.  It passed through or created towns along the way such as Greenfield, Watonga and Homestead in Blaine County; Cleo Springs, originally Cleo, in Major County; and, in Alfalfa County,  the towns of Aline, Augusta, Lambert, Ingersoll, Driftwood, and Amorita.  At the border, it continued about 16 miles north through Waldron, Kansas-- where it crossed the line of the Kansas City, Mexico and Orient Railroad-- to end at Anthony, Kansas, which had existed at the intersection of the St. Louis-San Francisco Railroad and the Missouri Pacific Railway since at least 1891.  This gave it a mainline of about 121 miles.  It also built a branch from its line at Ingersoll—a town created by the railroad—west to the Woods County seat of Alva, Oklahoma, about 16 miles.  This gave the railway a total trackage of about 137-138 miles.

This railroad was conveyed to the CO&G on May 3, 1902.

The Rock Island
The CO&G came under the control of the Chicago, Rock Island and Pacific Railroad (the "Rock Island") in 1902, and was formally merged into the Rock Island on January 1, 1948.  The Memphis-Amarillo route remained an important main line for the Rock Island, hosting local and transcontinental freight traffic as well as passenger trains such as the Choctaw Rocket from 1940-1964.

The Choctaw Route today

Ownership of the Choctaw Route's railway components were split into numerous pieces as a result of the dissolution of the Rock Island Railroad in 1980.  Some segments of the former CO&G were abandoned; others remain in use by the Union Pacific Railroad and various short lines.  As of 2014, the former Choctaw Route can be described from east to west as:

 Memphis, Tennessee to Brinkley, Arkansas: active; owned by Union Pacific
 Brinkley to the eastern side of Little Rock: abandoned, with rail removed
 Little Rock to Danville: active; operated by the Little Rock and Western Railway
 Danville to Howe, Oklahoma: abandoned, with rail removed; owned by the State of Oklahoma
 Howe to McAlester: active; owned and operated by the Arkansas–Oklahoma Railroad
 McAlester to Shawnee: disused, with rail in place but most road crossings paved over. Owned by the UP, last operated by Union Pacific in 1996
 Shawnee to Oklahoma City: active; owned by Union Pacific, operated by the Arkansas-Oklahoma Railroad
 Oklahoma City to El Reno: active; owned by Union Pacific, operated by Union Pacific and AT&L Railroad
 El Reno to Geary: active; owned and operated by AT&L railroad
 Geary to Watonga Spur: active; owned and operated by AT&L Railroad 
 Geary to Bridgeport: Active; Owned by the State of Oklahoma, operated by AT&L Railroad 
 Bridgeport to Weatherford: Out of service; owned by the State of Oklahoma. Rails are still in place for most of this segment, but several sections are washed out.
 Weatherford to Erick: active; owned by the State of Oklahoma, operated by the Farmrail Corporation
 Erick, Oklahoma to east end of Amarillo, Texas: abandoned, with rail removed

The former Choctaw Route passenger depot in Little Rock, Arkansas, is now a component of the William J. Clinton Presidential Center and Park, though the adjoining historic freight depot was razed as part of the Clinton Center's development.

See also
Francis I. Gowen

References

External links
 Rock Island Lines Historical Overview
 Choctaw, Oklahoma and Texas Railroad
 Choctaw Terminal, Little Rock, Arkansas
 Oklahoma Digital Maps: Digital Collections of Oklahoma and Indian Territory

Predecessors of the Chicago, Rock Island and Pacific Railroad
Defunct Arkansas railroads
Defunct Oklahoma railroads
Railway companies established in 1894
Railway companies disestablished in 1948
Defunct Kansas railroads